Askalaphium is a genus of ground beetles in the family Carabidae. This genus has a single species, Askalaphium depressum. It is found in Brazil and Peru.

References

Ctenodactylinae